Colin Arthur Garwood (born 29 June 1949 in Heacham, Norfolk) is an English former professional footballer who scored 157 goals from 426 games in the Football League playing as a striker for Peterborough United, Oldham Athletic, Huddersfield Town, Colchester United, Portsmouth and Aldershot during the 1960s, 1970s and 1980s. The £54,000 Aldershot paid Portsmouth in February 1980 was a club record.

References

1949 births
Living people
People from Heacham
English footballers
Association football forwards
Peterborough United F.C. players
Oldham Athletic A.F.C. players
Huddersfield Town A.F.C. players
Colchester United F.C. players
Portsmouth F.C. players
Aldershot F.C. players
Boston United F.C. players
English Football League players